Jay Leroy Hill (born March 16, 1975) is an American football coach. He is the defensive coordinator and associate head coach at Brigham Young University (BYU) in Provo, Utah. Hill served as the head football coach at Weber State University in Ogden, Utah from 2014 to 2022, compiling a record of 68–39 in nine seasons. He left Weber State as the program's all-time winningest head coach. Hill was an assistant coach at the University of Utah in Salt Lake City under Urban Meyer and Kyle Whittingham from 2001 to 2013.

Personal life
Hill is married to the former Sara Kern. They have four children: Ashtyn, Alayna, Allie and Jacob. Hill earned a bachelor's degree in Spanish in 2000 from the University of Utah and earned his master's degree in ESS/Sports Psychology from the University of Utah in 2005.

Head coaching record

References

External links
 Weber State profile

1975 births
Living people
American football cornerbacks
People from Lehi, Utah
Players of American football from Utah
Ricks Vikings football players
Utah Utes football coaches
Utah Utes football players
Weber State Wildcats football coaches
BYU Cougars football coaches